A transboundary breed is a breed which is present in several countries. Transboundary species of the five significant livestock types (cattle, sheep, goats, pigs and chickens), have been developed for a hundred years or more in intensive manufacturing systems, which has led to global availability.  A relatively small number of worldwide transboundary breeds compose the ever-increasing share of total global animal products. However, only in North America and the Southwest Pacific do the number of transboundary breeds surpass that of local breeds.

There can be both regional and international types of transboundary breeds. Regional breeds are breeds that are reported to only be found in one "region", which may include several countries, and an international transboundary breed is one that is reported to be found in multiple regions. For example, the Holstein Fresian cattle is an international transboundary breed, because it is found in several different continents and regions.

References

Breeding
Zoological nomenclature
Livestock